This is a list of FIPS 10-4 region codes from S-U, using a standardized name format, and cross-linking to articles.

On September 2, 2008, FIPS 10-4 was one of ten standards withdrawn by NIST as a Federal Information Processing Standard. The list here is the last version of codes. For earlier versions, see link below.

SA: Saudi Arabia

SC: Saint Kitts and Nevis

SE: Seychelles

SF: South Africa

SG: Senegal

SH: Saint Helena

SI: Slovenia

SL: Sierra Leone

SM: San Marino

SO: Somalia

SP: Spain

ST: Saint Lucia

SU: Sudan

SW: Sweden

SY: Syria

SZ: Switzerland

TD: Trinidad and Tobago

TH: Thailand

TI: Tajikistan

TN: Tonga

TO: Togo

TP: São Tomé and Príncipe

TS: Tunisia

TU: Turkey

TW: Taiwan

TX: Turkmenistan

TZ: Tanzania

UG: Uganda

UK: United Kingdom

UP: Ukraine

US: United States

UV: Burkina Faso

UY: Uruguay

UZ: Uzbekistan

See also
 List of FIPS region codes (A–C)
 List of FIPS region codes (D–F)
 List of FIPS region codes (G–I)
 List of FIPS region codes (J–L)
 List of FIPS region codes (M–O)
 List of FIPS region codes (P–R)
 List of FIPS region codes (V–Z)

Sources
 FIPS 10-4 Codes and history
 Last version of codes
 All codes (include earlier versions)
 Table to see the evolution of the codes over time
 Administrative Divisions of Countries ("Statoids"), Statoids.com

References 

Region codes